The KP-SAM ( "Shingung", hanja: 新弓) is a South Korean shoulder-launched surface-to-air missile manufactured by LIG Nex1. It is marketed internationally as the Chiron.

History 
The KP-SAM was created to protect ROK troops in the forward area, which started in 1995 under the direction of LIG Nex1. In late 2003, the delivery of the Igla SAMs from Russia in payment for Russian debts to Korea appear to have solved the problem momentarily. The KP-SAM began production in 2004 with extended trials in early 2005.

In late 2005, the KP-SAM entered service with the South Korean Army, after being in development for nearly 8 years. The South Korean Army has ordered some 2000 units to be delivered in the near future.

In 2011, the KP-SAM was proposed to the Indian military for potential export. It was being marketed in 2012 for India's modernization of their VSHORAD system, competing with the RBS 70, the Starstreak, the Mistral-2 and the SA-24.

In November 2012, Peru announced that they will purchase the Chiron alongside 108 missiles and three TPS-830KE radar under a $USD 43 million defense contract. However, the deal was called off in May 2013 over problems on paying for the contract.

In 2014, Indonesia bought the KP-SAM for integration with the Skyshield 35 mm anti-aircraft system. It was previously shown at the Indo Defence 2014 exhibition.

Features 
While the missile system externally resembles a French Mistral system, the entire missile system including the seeker, control section, warhead and motor were developed and manufactured in South Korea. The missile features integrated IFF systems, night and adverse weather capabilities, a two-colour (IR/UV) infrared seeker to aid in negating infrared countermeasures (IRCM) and a proximity-fuse warhead. During development tests the missile scored a 90% hit ratio.

According to Agency for Defense Development officials, the missile is superior to the American FIM-92 Stinger or the French Mistral in hit probability, price and portability. It had been involved in a missile test where the Shingung's missile made impact on a low-flying target as high as 3.5 kilometers with a speed of 697.5 m/s (more than Mach 2.36) and a distance range of 7 km.

Operators 

 : In ROK Army service since 2005.
 : Indonesian Air Force acquired and operated Chirons since 2014 which was integrated with Oerlikon Skyshield 35 mm anti-aircraft gun system. Additional 2 Chirons transferred according to a 2019 SIPRI small arms report.

Failed contracts

See also 
Anza (missile)
RBS-70
Starstreak (missile)

References 

21st-century surface-to-air missiles
Post–Cold War weapons of South Korea
Surface-to-air missiles of South Korea
Weapons and ammunition introduced in 2005